Heorhiy Vasylovych Tibilov (also Georgii Tibilov, ; born November 6, 1984 in Vladikavkaz, Russian SFSR) is an amateur Ukrainian freestyle wrestler, who played for the men's heavyweight category. He won a silver medal for his division at the 2008 European Wrestling Championships in Tampere, Finland, losing out to Georgia's Giorgi Gogshelidze.

Tibilov represented Ukraine at the 2008 Summer Olympics in Beijing, where he competed for the men's 96 kg class. He received a bye for the preliminary round of sixteen match, before losing out to Russia's Shirvani Muradov, with a three-set technical score (1–0, 0–1, 0–1), and a classification point score of 1–3. Because his opponent advanced further into the final match, Tibilov offered another shot for the bronze medal by defeating Turkey's Hakan Koç in the repechage round. He progressed to the bronze medal match, but narrowly lost the medal to Azerbaijan's Khetag Gazyumov, who was able to score seven points in two straight periods, leaving Tibilov without a single point.

References

External links
Profile – International Wrestling Database
NBC Olympics Profile

1984 births
Living people
Olympic wrestlers of Ukraine
Wrestlers at the 2008 Summer Olympics
Sportspeople from Vladikavkaz
Sportspeople from Kharkiv
Ukrainian male sport wrestlers
20th-century Ukrainian people
21st-century Ukrainian people